Time Heals may refer to:
HawthoRNe, a television show, which is a medical drama whose working title was Time Heals
UNIT: Time Heals, an audio drama based on science fiction television series Doctor Who
"Time Heals", a song by Rod Wave
"Time Heals," a song by Todd Rundgren from the 1981 album Healing
"Time Heals," a song by Gear Daddies from the 1991 album Billy's Live Bait
"Time Heals," a song by Peter Hammill from the 1977 album Over